Vaiyacheri is a village in the Papanasam taluk of Thanjavur district, Tamil Nadu, India.

Demographics 

As per the 2006 census, Vaiyacheri had a total population of 890 with 431 males and 459 females. The sex ratio was 1065. The literacy rate was 77.16.

Agriculture is the main activity in the village.

References 

 

Villages in Thanjavur district